Henry E. Petersen (January 1, 1921 – May 29, 1991) was an attorney and United States federal government official. He served as Assistant U.S. Attorney General during the Richard Nixon and Gerald Ford administrations. He also engaged in ethically questionable communications with Nixon and his staff, providing inside information about the Watergate investigation prior to the appointment of the Special Prosecutor.

Personal

Petersen was born in Philadelphia, Pennsylvania in 1921 and grew up in the Washington, D.C. area. Petersen served in the United States Marine Corps in the South Pacific during World War II. After returning, Petersen studied at Georgetown University and received his law degree from the Catholic University of America.

Peterson"s wife was Jean and kids were Julie, Jaqueline, and others

Petersen died of emphysema in Sunderland, Maryland in 1991 at age 70.

Involvement in the Watergate Scandal 
In his capacity as the Assistant Attorney General for the Criminal Division of the United States Department of Justice, Petersen oversaw the conduct of the Watergate investigation by federal prosecutors in the U.S Attorneys Office in Washington D.C. When Wright Patman announced that the House Banking Committee would be investigating Watergate, White House Counsel John Dean persuaded Petersen to ask the members of the House Banking Committee not to issue subpoenas for individuals involved in the Watergate scandal (including Dean himself) because it might jeopardise potential criminal trials. On October 2, 1972, at the behest of Dean, Petersen sent a letter to the members of the Committee asking that they not issue subpoenas, and the following day the Committee voted not to hold hearings on Watergate.

Sometime in late October 1972, Petersen informed Dean that Mark Felt was leaking information to the press. Felt would later come to be described in Bob Woodward and Carl Bernstein's bestselling book All the President's Men as "Deep Throat," whose identity would remain a mystery until 2005. Petersen did not divulge who told him this, however he explained that it was an attorney who was employed by one of the newspaper publications that Felt was leaking to. Dean reported this information back to the White House. When Chief of Staff H.R Haldeman reported the information to President Nixon, Haldeman advised Nixon not to fire Felt as "He knows everything that's to be known in the FBI." Author Max Holland speculates that it was Roswell Gilpatric who told Petersen that it was Felt who was leaking to Time magazine.

In April 1973, John Dean decided to cooperate with federal prosecutors in the Watergate investigation. Dean came to an agreement with lead prosecutor Earl Silbert that he would not report the information Dean gave back to Petersen (Silbert's superior) as he knew Petersen would inform the White House. When Dean informed Silbert that Nixon's two closest advisors, H.R Haldeman and John Ehrlichman were involved in an obstruction of justice, Silbert felt he had to inform Petersen of the situation. On April 15, 1973 Attorney General Richard Kleindienst and Petersen informed Nixon that Dean was cooperating and that the Justice Department was building a criminal case against Haldeman and Ehrlichman. Haldeman and Ehrlichman resigned fifteen days later while Dean was fired.

On April 17, 1973 Petersen told President Nixon that the Justice Department was investigating the break-in at Daniel Ellsberg's psychiatrist office by the White House Plumbers. Nixon ordered Petersen not to investigate the issue because "that was a national security matter." Petersen relayed this order back to Earl Silbert. Several days later however, Petersen and Kleindienst persuaded Nixon that the Justice Department needed to disclose the matter to the court in Daniel Ellsberg's criminal case.

Throughout April 1973, Nixon would use Petersen to extract important grand jury information about the Watergate case before divulging that information to subjects of the investigation. For example, on April 16, 1973 Petersen informed Nixon that Fred LaRue, a figure in the Watergate cover-up was cooperating with the grand jury. Nixon subsequently instructed Haldeman to inform Herb Kalmbach, another figure in the cover-up that LaRue was "talking freely." The conversations with Petersen would later be cited in the Articles of Impeachment against Richard Nixon, accusing the President of "disseminating information received from officers of the Department of Justice of the United States to subjects of investigations conducted by lawfully authorized investigative officers and employees of the United States, for the purpose of aiding and assisting such subjects in their attempts to avoid criminal liability."

Due to his role in the Watergate scandal, Petersen testified before the Senate Watergate Committee on August 7, 1973.

References

External links 

 
 

United States Assistant Attorneys General
1921 births
1991 deaths
Lawyers from Philadelphia
People from Washington, D.C.
Georgetown University alumni
Catholic University of America alumni
20th-century American lawyers
Nixon administration personnel involved in the Watergate scandal
United States Assistant Attorneys General for the Criminal Division
United States Marine Corps personnel of World War II